Julietge Bhumikawa (Illusions of Juliet) is a 1998 Sri Lankan Sinhala drama thriller film directed by Jackson Anthony as his maiden directorial venture  and co-produced by Gamini Nanayakkara and Anoja Weerasinghe. It stars Anoja Weerasinghe in lead role along with Kamal Addararachchi, Vasanthi Chathurani and Mahendra Perera. Music composed by Premasiri Khemadasa. It is the 902nd Sri Lankan film in the Sinhala cinema.

Awards
 Sarasaviya Critic Awards 1996 - Most Promising Director (Jackson Anthony)

Plot

Cast
 Anoja Weerasinghe as Anjali 'Anju' Senanayake
 Kamal Addararachchi as Devinda Dassanayake
 Vasanthi Chathurani as Saroja
 Mahendra Perera as Supun
 Daya Alwis as Lawrence
 Chandani Seneviratne as Psychologist
 Sriyantha Mendis as Theater director
 Kusum Renu as 'Putha' patient
 Chitra Wakishta as Gossiping dubber
 Sujani Menaka as Saroja's servant
 Kumara Thirimadura as Stage onlooker
 Sunil Soma Peiris as Somasekera
 Dilki Weerasinghe as Stage dancer
 Thamara Dilrukshi as Saroja's Nangi
 Shashi Wijendra as Somasekera's friend
 Rathnawali Kekunawela as Gossiping dubber
 Senaka Wijesinghe as Film assistant
 Sujatha Paramanathan as Mother
 Mali Jayaweerage as Head Nurse
 Sanet Dikkumbura as Asylum patient
 Jayalath Fernando as Asylum patient
 Winnie Wettasinghe as Asylum patient
 Upatissa Balasuriya as Assistant director
 Arun Dias Bandaranayake as Award presenter
 Premilla Kuruppu as Asylum patient

References

External links
 
 Julietge Bhoomikawa Sinhala Movie

1998 films
1990s Sinhala-language films
1990s thriller drama films
Sri Lankan thriller drama films
1998 drama films